Inertia is a 2001 Canadian drama film, directed by Sean Garrity.

The film stars Jonas Chernick, Sarah Constible, Gordon Tanner and Micheline Marchildon as Joseph, Laura, Bruce and Alex, four young professionals in Winnipeg, Manitoba who are embroiled in a "love rhombus" in which each is in unrequited love with one of the others.

The film won the award for Best Canadian First Feature Film at the 2001 Toronto International Film Festival,

References

External links 
 

2001 films
Canadian drama films
Films directed by Sean Garrity
2001 directorial debut films
English-language Canadian films
2000s English-language films
2000s Canadian films